Mizo Hlakungpui Mual (Mizo Poets' Square) is a monument to commemorate Mizo poets. It was set up in 1986 at the southern edge of Khawbung Village, Mizoram state, North-East India, about 100 miles northwest of Chittagong, Bangladesh.

Origin

In time, the local people decided to include all the Mizo Poets and writers who deserved recognition for their contributions to Mizo literature. The Committee agreed, and the selection procedures go as – Writers who have produced at least 3–4 books, and have had a prolonged influence on Mizo literature would be selected while Poets whose songs/poems have exceptional literary value would also be included. Writers/poets may only be included in Hlakungpui Mual five years after their death.

First Phase 1986
In the first phase were erected the monuments of Patea and Damhauhva on 6 & 7 April 1986 with their skeletal remains taken from their old grave, then were buried in the ground beneath their pyramidal monument. They were the first two interred in the Poets' Square.

Patea (1894–1950)
Patea composed 55 poems whose lyrics and harmonies expressed deeply traditional Mizo sentiments. His lyrics are mainly about lamentation, praise and heavenly sentiments.

Damhauhva (1909–72)
Damhauhva wrote 51 poems highly prized for their literary qualities in Mizo poetry. His poetical words emphasizing natural beauties and its harmonies are well matched. He composed many fine poems. The values of human life with regards to nature are expressed with poetical words.

Second phase: 1996
In course of time, there was an attempt to commemorate famous poets and writers whose fame spread throughout Mizoram and its adjoining regions. The process of selecting poets and writers was also strictly carried out. They had, to some extent, imitated what were found in Poets' Corner, the name traditionally given to a section of the South Transept of Westminster Abbey.

Below are the poets and writers arranged in order from the pyramidal monuments of Patea and Damhauva.

Writers

Kâphleia (1910–1940)
L. Biakliana (1918–1940)
Lalzuithanga (1916–1950)
C. Thuamluaia (1922–1959)
Rev. Liangkhaia (1985–1979)
J. F. Laldailova (1925–1979)
Capt. C. Khuma (1934–1994)
Siamkima (1938–1992)
K. Zawla (1903–1994)
K.C. Lalvunga (1929–1994)

Poets
Laithangpuia (1885–1937)
Lalzova (1924–1945)
Saihnûna (1896–1949)
Lalawithangpa (1885–1949)
R.L. Kâmlala (1902–1965)
Rokunga (1914–1969)
Vankhama (1906–1970)
Suakliana (1885–1937)
Liandala (1901–1980)
C.Z. Huala (1903–1994)

Third Phase – 2006
Below are the names of poets and writers included in the third phase.

Writers
Rev. Saiaithanga (1887–1980)
A. Sawihlira (1931–2000)

Poets
Zasiama (1900–1953)
Vanmawia (1922–1980)
Râlngama (1907–1981)
Siamliana (1894–1962)
Laltanpuia (1915–1997)

Fourth Phase 2011 (Silver Jubilee)

The Silver Jubilee of Mizo Hlakungpui Mual was celebrated on 6–7 April 2011 at the Poets' Square site in Khawbung, Mizoram, India.

Writers
Nuchhungi Renthlei (1914–2006)

Poets
P. S. Chawngthu (1922– 2005)
Zirsangzela Hnamte(1952–2002)
Rev Thangngura (1891–1943)

See also
Mizo literature

References

External links

 Mizo Hlakungpui Mual
 Video: Silver Jubilee of Mizo Poet's Square 6–7 April 2011.
 Photo gallery: Mizo Poets' Square
 Patea
 Photo Gallery for Mizo Poets and Writers

Mizo people
Monuments and memorials in India
Buildings and structures in Mizoram
Champhai district